The VR46 Racing Team is a motorcycle racing team owned by Valentino Rossi and based in Tavullia (Marche, Italy). The team enters Grand Prix motorcycle racing in the MotoGP category with Ducati motorcycles and in the Moto2 category with Kalex chassis, under the name Mooney VR46 Racing Team. The team manager is the former road racer Pablo Nieto.

The team has to date collected 28 race wins (9 in Moto3 and 19 in Moto2), one riders' championship (with Francesco Bagnaia in Moto2 in 2018), and one teams' championship (Moto2 in 2020).

History

Moto3
The team was founded in 2014 by the nine time world champion Valentino Rossi and entered the Moto3 World Championship as Sky Racing Team VR46, with the goal of promoting young Italian talent in response to the massive influx of Spanish riders in Grand Prix racing since the turn of the century. In the team's first year they choose Romano Fenati and Francesco Bagnaia as riders with Rossi's former Cagiva teammate Vittoriano Guareschi as team manager. It was an up and down season for Fenati, as he scored four podiums in the first six races and ultimately recorded four wins during the season. However, inconsistent results ultimately left him in 5th position in the championship with 176 points. Bagnaia finished top 10 five times during the first seven races with a 4th-place finish at Le Mans as his best result, where he also set the fastest lap of the race. Bagnaia missed the races at Assen and Sachsenring due to injury. After scoring 42 points in the first 7 races of the campaign, Bagnaia slumped badly during the second part of the season, only finishing in the points twice of the last nine races, clearly affected by his injury. He finished the season in 16th position with 50 points.

In 2015, Andrea Migno replaced Bagnaia and Guareschi was replaced by Pablo Nieto, Alessio ‘Uccio’ Salucci and Carlo Alberto Tebaldi. The 2015 season was also an under-performance for Fenati. Though he maintained some consistency finishing in the top five in eight races – including a victory at Le Mans. Poor qualifying positions for Fenati resulted in the loss of vital points, and he finished the season with 176 points – as he did in 2014 – but placed one position higher in the standings. Migno finished the season in 19th with 35 points.

In 2016, both Fenati and Migno were confirmed and a third bike was given to Nicolò Bulega, but Fenati was fired after ten races and replaced by Lorenzo Dalla Porta. Fenati started the 2016 season with a pole position at Qatar, however he only managed 4th in the race. He finished in 20th in Argentina, before his first win of the season in the United States. He was seventh at Jerez, before a second-place finish at Le Mans, losing out to Brad Binder by 0.099 seconds. Fenati qualified on pole at Mugello, but failed to finish the race. He was fourth in both Catalunya and Netherlands, before a pointless 18 position in Germany. Fenati was dropped by Sky Racing VR46 in Austria as a disciplinary action for a disagreement with Uccio Salucci, team manager and close friend of Rossi. On 16 August, the VR46 team terminated their contract with Romano for the 2016 and 2017 seasons, stating behavioural issues in conflict with team policy as the reason behind the split.

Bulega started the season with sixth place at Qatar. At his fifth race in Moto3, Bulega achieved his first Grand Prix podium at Jerez with 2nd-place finish having started from pole position, which was his first pole position in Grand Prix. Bulega's first fastest lap came at the British Grand Prix in the last lap. Followed by a crash in Aragon, On his birthday Bulega finished the Japanese grand Prix at fourth place and set the fastest lap. But after the third place holder Hiroki Ono was disqualified Bulega was awarded third place. Both in Australia and Malaysia Bulega crashed in the opening lap. His last three crashes in Aragon, Australia and Malaysia was because of the fellow riders. Despite qualifying 4th, Bulega started the final race at Valencia in 16th place due to a twelve-place grid penalty and finished the race in 17th, losing the Rookie of the Year title to Joan Mir. Bulega finished the championship in 7th place with 129 points. Migno achieved two 3rd place finishes (Assen and Valencia) and finished the season in 17th placeoverall with 63 points.

Both Migno and Bulega were retained for the 2017 season. In a year in which previous Rookie of the Year title rival Joan Mir won the Moto3 championship, Bulega struggled to follow up his debut season. Beluga'S difficulties included bad qualifying strategies and poor race starts (his height being a primary factor). His best result on the year was a 4th place finish in Germany, one of the few times he was able to qualify on the top six, and a handful of 5th places, including one in his "home" race in the San Marino race. He finished the disappointing year in just 12th place, with 81 points. Migno won his home Grand Prix  in Mugello, and finished the season in 9th place with 118 points.

In 2018, Bulega was initially confirmed (then replaced by Celestino Vietti due to injury) and Dennis Foggia was named as second rider. Bulega's first five 2018 races were even worse than the previous year's. He retired in the first four races and finished only on the fifth race, with a 17th place in Spain, being one of the two regular drivers to never score points in the first five races of the year. Both Vietti and Foggia achieved a third place as best result of the season.

In 2019, Vietti and Foggia were confirmed as regular riders. Vietti achieved three podiums (Spain, Catalonia and Japan), one pole and one fastest lap, finishing the season 6th with 135 points. Foggia reached a third place in Aragon as best result and a fastest lap in Netherland, finishing the season 12th with 97 points.

Andrea Migno returned to the squad to partner Vietti for 2020. With two race wins and four podiums for Vietti and regular points-scoring finishes for Migno, the team finished 3rd in the teams' championship.

The VR46 team left the Moto3 class after 2020, citing 'a lack of Italian talent' available between many Italian Moto3 teams (such as Gresini, Sic58, Snipers, and Max Racing), and an agreement with Esponsorama Racing which would see Sky VR46 enter the MotoGP class with the Spanish team and Esponsorama to expand their Moto3 operations with KTM machinery made available by VR46's departure.

Moto2
In 2017, the team decided to take part in the Moto2 class also and selected Bagnaia and Stefano Manzi as riders.
In just his fourth-ever Moto2 race at Jerez, Bagnaia finished 2nd. He finished 2nd in the next race as well at Le Mans, after having qualified in 2nd place and missing pole position to Thomas Lüthi by just 0.026 seconds. Bagnaia took a third podium at Sachsenring, finishing 3rd behind Franco Morbidelli who won the race and Miguel Oliveira who came in second. At Misano, Bagnaia originally finished the race 4th behind Dominique Aegerter, Thomas Lüthi, and Hafizh Syahrin - however Aegerter was later disqualified, promoting Bagnaia to his fourth podium of the season. He was crowned Moto2 Rookie of the year after the Japanese Grand Prix at Motegi, and finished his rookie season with 174 points to place 5th in the Moto2 Championship, scoring points in 16 of the 18 races. Manzi finished the season in 25th place with 14 points.

In 2018, Bagnaia was confirmed to continue with the team and Luca Marini, Rossi's half-brother, was selected as second rider.
Bagnaia opened the season with a win in Qatar, having led the race from start to finish. Bagnaia took a second win in Austin after a hard fight with Álex Márquez, winning the race with a gap of 2.4 seconds and also setting the fastest lap of the race. At Jerez, Bagnaia finished 3rd behind Lorenzo Baldassarri and Miguel Oliveira, holding his starting grid position. Bagnaia took his first pole position in Moto2 at Le Mans, like the race in Qatar he led from start to finish. The win was also his third podium at Le Mans since 2015. Bagnaia took a fourth win at Assen, again the race from pole position and leading the entire race. After qualifying 3rd on the grid in Sachsenring, Bagnaia finished the race in 12th place, having been forced outside of the track after Mattia Pasini fell in front of him in the last corner on the second lap. Despite being down to 26th position, Bagnaia still made up fourteen places, including overtaking Álex Márquez on the final lap in the last corner. At Brno, Bagnaia finished third and lost the championship lead to Oliveira. He retook the championship lead at Austria, winning his fifth race of the season. Bagnaia won his sixth race of the season at Misano from pole position. He took a fifth-straight podium at Buriram, winning the race with his teammate Luca Marini in second place. He took his eighth and final win of the season at Motegi, after Fabio Quartararo (who initially won the race) was disqualified due to low tyre pressure. After finishing 3rd at Sepang,Bagnaia was crowned Moto2 World Champion with his twelfth podium of the season. Marini achieved his first podium in Germany and his first victory in Malaysia, concluding the season in 7th place with 147 points. The VR46 team finished the teams' championship in 2nd place.

In 2019, Marini was confirmed for another season and Nicolò Bulega was selected as second rider. Marini won two races (Thailand and Japan), achieved a second place (Italy), a third place (Netherlands), a pole position (Japan) and a fastest lap (Austria), finishing the season 6th with 190 points. Bulega finished 17th with 48 points, with a 7th place finish as his best result of the season.

For 2020, Marini was partnered with Marco Bezzecchi. With strong performances from both riders (three race wins and six podiums for Marini, two race wins and seven podiums for Bezzecchi), VR46 clinched their first teams' championship with Marini and Bezzecchi finishing 2nd and 4th respectively in the riders' championship. 

In 2021, Bezzecchi was joined by Celestino Vietti coming from the Moto3 team. With one race win and seven podiums from Bezzecchi and regular points finishes from Vietti, VR46 achieved 3rd place in the teams' championship.

Vietti was paired with Niccolò Antonelli for 2022. Vietti took his first Moto2 class win at the season opener in Qatar.

From 2023, Fantic will be its own team at the expense of the VR46 entry, The partnership will be already operational from the race at Silverstone 2022, where the Fantic brand appeared on the motorcycles of Celestino Vietti Ramus and Niccolò Antonelli.

MotoGP 
In 2021, Luca Marini made his MotoGP debut, as VR46 and Esponsorama Racing came to an agreement where Esponsorama would organize the racing operations for an entry under the Italian flag and the Sky VR46 name and livery.

Beginning in 2022, the VR46 team entered the MotoGP championship in their own right, taking over the grid slots from Esponsorama Racing who left the premier class after 10 seasons. The team has signed a contract with Ducati for the use of their satellite machinery until at least the end of 2024. Title sponsorship of the team will be fulfilled by the Mooney Group, an Italian fintech joint venture between energy concern Enel and banking group Intesa Sanpaolo. The team will make their debut in the class with riders Luca Marini and Marco Bezzecchi. In this season, Luca Marini riding with a Ducati Desmosedici GP22 bike, while Marco Bezzecchi riding with a Ducati Desmosedici GP21 bike.

Grand Prix motorcycle results

Moto3

(key) (Races in bold indicate pole position; races in italics indicate fastest lap)

Moto2

(key) (Races in bold indicate pole position; races in italics indicate fastest lap)

MotoGP

(key) (Races in bold indicate pole position; races in italics indicate fastest lap)

List of Grand Prix winners

References

Valentino Rossi
Motorcycle racing teams
Motorcycle racing teams established in 2014
2014 establishments in Italy